The tsuur (Mongolian), choor (Kyrgyz) or chuur (Tuvan) is an end-blown flute of varying lengths that is common among Inner Asian pastoralists.

It is similar to the sybyzgy (Kazakh) and kurai (Bashkir). In western Mongolia it is mainly used by the Altai Uriankhai people, although other ethnic groups like the Kazakhs and the Tuvans are known to play them or have played them. 

There are only three holes to the finger. The blowing technique utilizes the teeth, tongue, and lips in the same way as Ney in Classical Persian music. The Tsuur is usually immersed in water before playing in order to seal any leaks in the wood.

The melodies that are played on the Tsuur are usually imitations of the sound of water, animal cries, and birdsongs as heard by shepherds whilst on the steppes or the mountain slopes of the Altai. One of the melodies, “The flow of the River Eev” as was said before is the river where the sound of khöömii was mythically supposed to have originated.
The Uriangkhai called the Tsuur the “Father of Music”. A three-holed pipe was in use in Mongolia in the 18th century and was believed to possess the magical properties of bringing Lamb’s bones back to life. In the Jangar epic of the 14th century the Tsuur is said to have had a voice like a swan. This reference may also be indirectly a very early reference to khöömii as the singing style sung with the Tsuur is Khailakh.

Traditional Mongolian Tsuur music was added to the List of Intangible Cultural Heritage in Need of Urgent Safeguarding in 2009.

See also
Music of Mongolia
Ney
Quray (flute)
Kaval
Washint
Duduk
Jedinka
Shvi
Frula
Sybyzgy
Shagur

References

External links
“Mongolian Tsuur” national programme approved
Traditional music of the Tsuur
Tsuur - wooden-wind instrument
Face Music - Traditional Instruments - Mongolia
Asia Pacific Cultural Centre for UNESCO (ACCU) - Tsuur
Mongolia elected to UNESCO Committee

Mongolian musical instruments
End-blown flutes
Tuvan musical instruments
Kazakhstani musical instruments
Bashkir musical instruments
Buryat musical instruments
Altai musical instruments